Werk may refer to:

 Elliot Werk (born 1957), Democratic politician from Boise, Idaho
 Nicholas Werk (born 14th-century), English politician
 colloquial name for Třinec Iron and Steel Works in the Czech Republic
 WERK, a radio station in Muncie, Indiana
 Werk 80, a 1997 album by German band Atrocity
 Werk Arena, an indoor sporting arena in Třinec, Czech Republic
 Werk Discs, an independent record label based in London
 German and Dutch for work